Dance Party USA is a 2006 film written and directed by Aaron Katz. It stars Cole Pensinger and Anna Kavan. The film and director have also been mentioned by the media as an important part of the "mumblecore" movement in independent cinema.

Plot
Apathetic 17-year-old Gus meets Jessica at a party, where he confesses to her that he raped an underage girl. He then sets out to appease his conscience.

Production 
The film took nearly two years to complete.  Katz explained the reason for such as being due to the film's editor, Zach Clark, living in Virginia while he lived in Brooklyn.  Clark would send edited footage on a DVD to Katz, who would then respond by sending notes to Clark.

Release 
The film debuted at the 2006 South by Southwest Film Festival and subsequently played at almost a dozen other festivals around the country and a two-week exclusive run at the Pioneer Theatre in New York City.

Reception 
The New York Times stated that "Dance Party USA is a remarkably delicate construction, directed with extraordinary empathy by Aaron Katz."  In addition, The New York Sun placed it at number nine on their Top 10 Films of 2006 list and critic Amy Taubin lauded it in Art Forum, saying it was "in her pantheon of coming of age films."

References

External links
 

2006 films
2000s coming-of-age drama films
2000s teen drama films
American coming-of-age drama films
American independent films
American teen drama films
Camcorder films
Films scored by Keegan DeWitt
Films shot in Oregon
Independence Day (United States) films
Mumblecore films
2006 drama films
2000s English-language films
2000s American films